The 2009–10 Boise State Broncos men's basketball team represented Boise State University in the 2009–10 college basketball season.  This was head coach Greg Graham's eighth and final season at Boise State as he was fired at the end of the season. The Broncos competed in the Western Athletic Conference and played their home games at the Taco Bell Arena. Boise State finished the season 15–17, 5–11 in WAC play and lost in the quarterfinals of the 2010 WAC men's basketball tournament to Utah State.

Pre-season
In the WAC preseason polls, released October 20 via media teleconference, Boise State was selected to finish 7th in the coaches poll and 5th in the media poll.

2009–10 Team

Roster
Source
Indicates Red Shirt Year

Coaching staff

2009–10 schedule and results
Source
All times are Mountain

|-
!colspan=9| Exhibition

|-
!colspan=9| Regular Season

|-
!colspan=9| 2010 WAC men's basketball tournament

Season highlights
On November 30, Sr. Ike Okoye was named the WAC player of the week for the third week of the season with weekly averages of 17.0 PPG, 12.5 RPG, 2.5 AST, 4.5 Blocks and 54.2 FG%.

On March 1, Jr. Robert Arnold was named the WAC player of the week for the sixteenth week of the season with weekly averages of 22.0 PPG, 9.0 RPG, 3.0 AST, and 75.0 FG%.

References

Boise State
Boise State Broncos men's basketball seasons
Boise
Boise